The UK Withdrawal from the European Union (Continuity) (Scotland) Act 2021 (known colloquially as the Continuity Act or the EU Continuity Act) is an Act passed by the Scottish Parliament on 22 December 2020 and receiving royal assent on 29 January 2021. It is a major Scottish constitutional statute, providing for devolved Scots law to stay aligned to future EU law despite the withdrawal of the United Kingdom from the European Union on 31 January 2020.

References

Acts of the Scottish Parliament 2021
Brexit
Scottish independence